Randall Franks is an American film and television actor, author, and bluegrass singer and musician who plays fiddle, mandolin, guitar, and mountain dulcimer. He was inducted into the Tri-State Gospel Music Hall of Fame (Georgia, Tennessee and Alabama) in 2022; and America's Old Time Country Music Hall of Fame in 2019;  Independent Country Music Hall of Fame in 2013; recognized by the International Bluegrass Music Museum & Hall of Fame in 2010 as a Bluegrass Legend; the Carolinas Country, Bluegrass and Gospel Hall of Fame presented him it’s Legend Award and designated him as the “Appalachian Ambassador of the Fiddle” in 2010; inducted into the Atlanta Country Music Hall of Fame in 2004; and was designated by Catoosa County, Ga. as "Appalachian Ambassador of the Fiddle" in 2004; and was inducted into the Chamber Business Person Hall of Fame  and honored as Patriotic Citizen of the Year in 2020. He was chosen as the first 2020 AirPlay Direct Evolution Grant Artist (www.AirPlayDirect.com).

Ancestry
The Appalachian is a cousin of American founding fathers George Washington and Thomas Jefferson; and also a kinsmen to John Adams, James Madison and James Monroe – founders who all served as president of the United States. Fifty-six men signed the United States Declaration of Independence from Great Britain and the rule of King George III. Of those 56 men who approved the document on July 4, 1776, 48 were Randall’s family members.
He also descends from several European royal houses including the English House of Tudor and Plantagenet dynasties, French Capetian Dynasty, Russian Rurik Dynasty and the Scottish House of Bruce and House of Stuart. Among his grandfathers are King Henry VII of England, King Edward IV of England, King James V and Robert the Bruce of Scotland and King Philip IV of France.

TV and Movies

In 2023, he is slated to play “Dr. Caring” in the phycological thriller “The Ageless” based on an upcoming novel by Deborah Robillard and is directing and starring in the American Revolution era film short "The American's Creed" as "Robert B. Shields" and the documentary "The Making of 'The American's Creed'."

After taking a hiatus (2001-2009) from film and dramatic television, he returned in 2009 as attorney Alvin Potter for Robert Townsend's Musical Theater of Hope.

Franks came to television as a youth performing on variety shows as a musician and singer.
He followed in the footsteps of members of his family who became pioneers or major stars of the film and television industry some including Cecil B. DeMille, Buster Keaton, John Wayne, Lucille Ball, Jimmy Stewart, Andy Griffith, James Dean, Katharine Hepburn and Bing Crosby.
Franks began his movie career in 1988 with a singing role in the movie Desperate for Love. Like many actors his early appearances were in bit roles such as a sports reporter in "Blind Side" in 1988 and a small part in Hulk Hogan's "No Holds Barred" before landing his breakthrough role on network television on "In the Heat of the Night."

Best known as:
 Officer Randy Goode (1988-1993) in the television series In the Heat of the Night The cast during his tenure was recognized by winning the NAACP Image Award for Outstanding Drama Series (formally Outstanding Drama Series, Mini-Series or Television Movie), two years in a row, 1992 and 1993. and was nominated for the Golden Globe for Best Television Drama in 1990 and 1991.  
Other roles:
 The Crickets Dance as Dr. J.A. Anderson in 2020  winning eleven film festival awards including the Best Ensemble Cast and Best Feature Film 
 Broken as Marv Headly in 2015 starring with Soren Fulton
 The Solomon Bunch as Edgar Albert in 2013 
 Lukewarm as Pastor John Keebley in 2012 starring with John Schneider, Nicole Gale Anderson, Bill Cobbs, Jeremy Jones and Jenna Von Oy. The show debuted on GMC-TV in April 2013.
He served as an Appalachian musician consultant and appeared with his Cornhuskers String Band for the 2012 feature Lawless (film).
 Principal Nate Foster in the 2011 film Decision starring with Natalie Grant and Billy Dean
 Attorney Alvin Potter as series regular in the 2009 Robert Townsend (actor) TV series The Musical Theater of Hope  
 Hallmark Hall of Fame's The Flamingo Rising as Officer Randy Kraft starring with William Hurt, Elizabeth McGovern and Brian Benben
 Starring role as Todd with Stella Parton in the sci-fi thriller Phoenix Falling
 Starring role as Captain Morgan Fairhope in Firebase 9
 He appeared in Dolly Parton's Blue Valley Songbird

Franks hosted and directed the PBS documentary Still Ramblin, about Ramblin' "Doc" Tommy Scott. He worked on the sets of Grace Under Fire and Foxworthy in Studio City, California. Franks shares memories, musical performances, visits to movie sets and premieres from his career on his YouTube channel - Randall Franks TV. He appeared on numerous shows as a musical artist, some among them are the Country Kids TV Series, Tonight at Ferlinghetti's (PBS 1985-87), Nashville Now, Crook and Chase, Miller & Company, Reno's Old Time Music Festival, and HGTV's Extreme Homes.

Author
His first novel was "A Badge or an Old Guitar: A Music City Murder Mystery". His hero, small-town police officer James Randall, experiences an opportunity for music stardom but gets entangled into a big-city murder mystery.

His 2016 book, "Encouragers III: A Guiding Hand" is the third volume in a three-book series highlighting actors, entertainers and everyday folks who have played a role in his life. The 448-page book includes over 58 stories and 395 photos including special Moments in Time photos featuring over 125 stars from Dean Cain to Dolly Parton and Jeff Foxworthy to Third Day from Randall's personal collection and 72 celebrity, family and friend recipes.

His 2015 book, "Encouragers II: Walking with the Masters" is the second volume in a three-book series highlighting actors, entertainers and everyday folks who have played a role in his life. It includes 49 stories of encouragement, over 300 photos and 49 celebrity and friend recipes.

"Encouragers I: Finding the Light," the first volume in the three-book series highlighting actors, entertainers and everyday folks who have played a role in his life. It includes 49 stories of encouragement, over 260 photos and 49 celebrity and friend recipes and was released in 2014.

Franks completed ”Whittlin' and Fiddlin' My Own Way: The Violet Hensley Story” in 2014 an autobiography of Silver Dollar City personality Violet Hensley, the whittlin' fiddler of Yellville, Arkansas.

Franks book, ”A Mountain Pearl: Appalachian Reminiscing and Recipes” was inspired by the stories of his late mother Pearl Franks.

Among his other books are ” Stirring Up Additional Success with a Southern Flavor” and ” Stirring Up Success with a Southern Flavor”, both co-authored with Shirley Smith, executive director for the Catoosa County Learning Center. Proceeds donated to the facility through this fundraiser were $27,000 in 2004. Smith and Franks partnered again in 2009 for the sequel with even more celebrities joining in to raise more funds for the Catoosa County Learning Center.

With the 2007 release of " Snake Oil, Superstars, and Me”, the autobiography of Ramblin' "Doc" Tommy Scott, Franks joined Scott and fellow co-author Shirley Noe Swiesz in completing the 700-page project highlighting Scott's 90 years on the stage, film, and television.

As of 2023, he is working on a book tentatively titled “Frankly Speaking: Thoughts on This and That” 

 Journalist 

Franks began writing articles while in high school, and some were published in Bluegrass Unlimited, the SEBA Breakdown, Precious Memories magazine, and elsewhere.

Like his more famous writing cousin Mark Twain (Samuel Clemens)  he searched for humor and inspiration as he focused on journalism from 2001–2009 in association with News Publishing Co. His journalistic efforts brought about 21 Georgia Press and National Press associations awards including a First Place Feature Photo. He writes a column called Southern Style which continues in publications from North Carolina to Louisiana. He currently writes for various magazines.

Music Artist

 Early Years 

The sound of the Southern Gospel piano and Appalachian fiddle is what inspired Randall Franks into music initially through family reunions and then it was Ervin Rouse’s “Orange Blossom Special” played by Dr. Donald Grisier in his third-grade elementary school room which brought him to sign up for violin lessons. However, it wasn’t classical music which moved him, and his search brought him to learn from fiddlers Dallas Burrell, WSB (AM) Barndance Host Cotton Carrier, The Skillet Lickers’s Gordon Tanner and Anita Sorrells Mathis.

Made up of his fellow string students, weekly jam sessions led to the creation of his childhood band – The Peachtree Pickers, whose public performances gained a regular slot on “The Country Kids TV Series” and appearances for the Grand Ole Opry. Five Perfection Sound and Attieram Records albums were released.

To support the group's efforts Franks started a Randall "Randy" Franks Peachtree Picker Fan Club, coordinated by Pearl Bruce. The club grew to include around 8,000 fans by 1986 rivaling and exceeding those of top country stars of the period. Franks created The Pickin' Post newsletter to keep the large group of fans informed sharing info on his career as well as Southern bluegrass festivals and other groups. The club also launched The Singing Post for fans exclusively interested in gospel music. The club grew even more dramatically during Franks' success on television.

After the members of the Peachtree Pickers embarked on different journeys in college, Franks decided to focus on creating music as a solo artist and studying acting. He juggled his own performances between guest appearances with various acts and acting opportunities. Making his first guest star appearance for the Grand Ole Opry in 1983, he continued appearing for the mother church of country music through 2015.

 Randall Franks and the Hollywood Hillbilly Jamboree 

With the chart success of his 1990 solo release "Handshakes and Smiles," Franks formed his Hollywood Hillbilly Jamboree featuring his unique style of Appalachian bluegrass, gospel and traditional country. Using his Hollywood friendships, he brought Donna Douglas of "The Beverly Hillbillies", Sonny Shroyer of "The Dukes of Hazzard" and Dan Biggers of "In the Heat of the Night" into a live and a commercial performance package while calling upon many of his music friends to add to the long musical legacy of the show originally created by Ramblin' "Doc" Tommy Scott in 1945. The historical Jamboree included stars spanning from Uncle Dave Macon, Stringbean Akeman, Carolina Cotton, Johnny Mack Brown, Ray Whitley, Sunset Carson, Fuzzy St. John, to Tim McCoy and others.
As of 2022, in its 77th year, the show allowed him to expand his performances into the fair market and larger country music shows including its largest audience of over 30,000 at one South Carolina Show in 1999.   Over the last three decades has included: The Sand Mountain Boys, Ryan Robertson, Barney Miller, Roger Hammett, James Watson, Bill Everett, Gilbert Hancock, Sue and Kim Koskela, Danny Bell, David Davis and the Warrior River Boys, Gary Waldrep, The Dowden Sisters, Ryan Stinson, the Watkins Family, Wesley Crider, Jaden Maxwell, Colton Brown, Caleb Lewis, Dawson Wright and others.
In an industry of established stars, Franks and Alison Krauss became the most visible fiddling personalities in the late eighties and early nineties. After "Handshakes and Smiles," Randall Franks continued stacking successes through the 1990s, his top Country Vocal Collaboration with Grand Ole Opry stars The Whites with "Let's Live Every Day Like It Was Christmas," followed by the two-bluegrass Top-30 albums "Sacred Sounds of Appalachia" in 1992 and "Tunes and Tales from Tunnel Hill" in 1995. As one of the leading 90s acts in bluegrass, he hosted the 1995 SPBGMA Bluegrass Music Awards in Nashville and presented Male Vocalist of the Year at Owensboro’s IBMA Awards in 1992 to Del McCoury.

He has performed at  Country Music Association Fan Fair, most of the leading Bluegrass Festivals, The National Folk Festival (United States), National Black Arts Festival, Georgia Mountain Fair, Academy of Country Music Fan Fest,  Grand Ole Opry, Fiddlin' Fish Music and Arts Festival, The Grand Masters, and a Command Presidential Performance.

 Fiddling 

The influence of the Georgia Fiddle Bands is apparent within Franks's style and recordings. He was exposed to the work of Fiddlin' John Carson, The Skillet Lickers and other Georgia fiddlers. He grew and gained skills by competing in Georgia fiddle contests, many fostered by World Record Mandolinist Bill Lowery as well as the Grand Ole Opry's Grand Master Fiddler Championship. Franks became a regular performer at the Grand Master Championship for the Opry. His bluegrass recording Tunes and Tales from Tunnel Hill includes a fact-based comedy recording entitled "Big Tige, Mr. Roy and Me," describing a teenage adventure with Opry fiddling stars Benny Martin and Roy Acuff following a Grand Masters Championship.  In the 1990s Georgia honored Franks for his work to preserve the heritage of Georgia's fiddling by naming a state-sponsored fiddle contest in his honor hosted then at Lake Lanier Islands.  The Randall Franks Trophy is presented to the winner each year at the 1890s Day Jamboree Old Time Fiddler's Convention in Ringgold, Georgia. 
Randall Franks Trophy winners 1994-2018 are Jack Weeks, Roy Crawford, Johnny Ray Watts (Three-Times), Aerin DeJarnette, Mark Ralph, Doug Fleener, Megan Lynch, Maddie Denton (Five-Times), and Tyler Andal.  Franks also co-hosts America's Grand Master Fiddler Championship annually in Nashville at the Country Music Hall of Fame. Franks recorded four fiddle recordings including Peach Picked Fiddle Favorites, Pick of the Peaches Fiddlin', Golden River Fiddlin', and Sacred Sounds of Appalachia.
He has performed or recorded with Carl Perkins; Charlie Daniels; Peabo Bryson; The Whites; Ricky Skaggs; Kitty Wells; Pee Wee King; Jimmy Dickens; Jeff and Sheri Easter; The Lewis Family; The Isaacs; the Primitive Quartet; Bill Monroe; Jim and Jesse; Ralph Stanley; Raymond Fairchild; Jimmy Martin; Mac Wiseman; Chubby Wise; Josh Graves; Doug Dillard; Jerry Douglas; Sam Bush; Byron Berline; John Schneider (screen actor), Smith and Wesley, the Warrior River Boys; the Sand Mountain Boys; the Gary Waldrep Band; the Cox Family; the Watkins Family; the Sidemen; Elaine and Shorty; and "Doc" Tommy Scott's Last Real Old Time Medicine Show.

 Randall Franks and the Georgia Mafia Bluegrass Band 

The Georgia Mafia Bluegrass Band was the brainchild of the late Georgia Music Hall of Fame member Johnny Carson. The group created in 2009 is an all-star band of Atlanta Country Music Hall of Fame members brought together to support Randall Franks initially in his performance for a PBS television special. The group includes Franks (fiddle), Jerry Burke (fiddle) and Helen Burke (guitar), J. Max McKee (banjo), Rick Smith (guitar) and Dean Marsh (bass). He appeared with that group performing on the live Georgia Public Broadcasting of the Georgia Music Hall of Fame Awards alongside Collective Soul and Third Day honoring Georgia music pioneer John L. "Johnny" Carson. The award-winning group, which won Bluegrass Band of the Year seven times, continues performing at special events and award shows with various members in Georgia, the Carolinas and Tennessee. The band’s performance of “The Old Black Fiddle” is included on “Randall Franks: 30 Years on TV and Radio - Vol. II.” 

 Randall Franks and the Cornhuskers String Band 

Franks created this Appalachian music group in 2011 for a special period performance in a film based on the novel “The Wettest County in the World”, released in 2012 as “Lawless (film).” As an Appalachian musician consultant for director John Hillcoat, he combined the talents of Jerry Burke (mandolin), Barney Miller (resonator guitar), Hollis Landrum (banjo), Rusty Tate (banjo) with his fiddling. The band performed live for the cast Tom Hardy, Shia LaBeouf, Jason Clarke,  and Dane DeHaan to immerse them in Appalachian music and for a community dance. The group was joined on camera by actress Mia Wasikowska playing mandolin and singing with his band. The band’s performance of “Little Liza Jane” is included on “Randall Franks: 30 Years on TV and Radio - Vol. II.” 

Other Musical Acts

Bill Monroe and the Blue Grass Boys

It was Country, Bluegrass, Rock and Songwriter Halls of Fame member Bill Monroe who mentored Randall Franks into the Grand Ole Opry family. After teaching Franks one on one, Monroe arranged for his youth band – The Peachtree Pickers to appear, beginning Franks long relationship with country’s mother church. When the legendary fiddler Kenny Baker left the Blue Grass Boys in 1984, Randall was who Monroe tapped to step into his shoes. Franks was still in school but traveled the U.S. alongside Monroe, Wayne Lewis, Blake Williams and Tater Tate before returning to school. During this period, several live recordings of his fiddling with Monroe occurred and “Back Up and Push” was released in 2016. His participation in Monroe’s legacy is recognized by the International Bluegrass Music Hall of Fame and Museum, The State of Kentucky, Bluegrass Unlimited and the Grand Ole Opry. Monroe welcomed Franks to appear on his shows throughout the rest of his career. He has participated in Blue Grass Boys reunions since 2007.

Doodle and the Golden River Grass
Franks was also tapped by Folk Music's Doodle and the Golden River Grass to fill the fiddle role in the internationally recognized Appalachian performing group. He joined the group (1963-1995) featuring John "Doodle" Thrower, James Watson, Gene Daniell, Wesley Clackum, and C.J. Clackum beginning in 1985 carrying on the Georgia Fiddle Band tradition. The group appeared repeatedly on PBS, America's National Folk Festival, World's Fair, Olympics, festivals and concerts. The band recorded on 17 albums highlighting their music including the Grammy winning "Art of Field Recording Vol. 1".Pickens County Progress (USA)1 October 1987, "Georgia Marble Festival"

The Marksmen Quartet

Multi-award-winning gospel quartet, the Marksmen Quartet of Murrayville, Ga, also added Franks to its musical ensemble in 1984. Franks admired the group led by Dr. Earle Wheeler for their vocal artistry and performed intermittently with the group into the early 1990s. He recorded several albums sharing in many chart songs and industry awards with the Dove Award nominees which during his tenure also included Mark Wheeler, Keith Chambers, Darrin Chambers and Rob Gillentine. The group and or members have participated in Randall's recordings, concerts and videos since the 1980s including Franks's 2012 "Concert of Celebration" DVD."Encouragers I: Finding the Light" Peach Picked Publishing by Randall Franks 2014 Pgs. 97-112

Jeff & Sheri Easter

Franks became the first fiddler for the Grammy nominated duo Jeff & Sheri Easter when they began their career touring to promote their debut album - New Tradition. Franks appeared live and on television with the group which went on to become an integral part of Bill Gaither (gospel singer)'s Homecoming Friends. Jeff & Sheri both appeared on Franks's top-selling 1990 "Handshakes and Smiles" release and singles from that project  and on his 2012 "Concert of Celebration" DVD.

David Davis and the Warrior River Boys

Franks appeared with David Davis (bluegrass) as a sideman in the Warrior River Boys occasionally playing fiddle, guitar and bass. He also appeared on numerous shows as a special guest performer. Davis and his band occasionally performed during the 1990s as part of Randall Franks and the Hollywood Hillbilly Jamboree.
Franks and Davis released the Appalachian brother duet album “God’s Children” in 2000 joined by Warrior River Boy Marty Hays and special guests Sonny Shroyer, “Doc” Tommy Scott and Cotton and Jane Carrier (More info in a later section). The duo debuted the album at the historic Signal Mountain Opry in Walden, Tenn. The duo also appeared on the 2009 Bluegrass Bands and Helping Hands CD "Heaven Knows Where We Will Go from Here." Davis also appeared on Franks's 2012 "Concert of Celebration" DVD.

Jim and Jesse and the Virginia Boys

Franks association with Grand Ole Opry stars Jim & Jesse began as a youth in their Fan Club.
The duo mentored Franks into country music opportunities helping establish him as an artist.
Jesse joined him on his first solo release “Handshakes and Smiles” establishing him onto the Nashville music scene with his first charting album and several other albums including an appearance on Franks's 2012 "Concert of Celebration" DVD. In addition to appearing as a Virginia Boy playing fiddle both with Jim & Jesse and later with just Jesse after Jim’s passing, Franks regularly appeared as a guest star on the Jim & Jesse Show during the 1990s, and they often served as his band in special Grand Ole Opry, TV appearances and on Franks's Grand Ole Opry "Share with DARE" Concerts.
The duo appeared with Franks on the In the Heat of the Night "Christmas Time’s A Comin’" CD and recorded the ballad “Mean Joe Blake” with Franks which he co-authored with actor Alan Autry.

The Lewis Family

Gospel and Bluegrass Music halls of fame members The Lewis Family were a great inspiration to Franks from childhood. Little Roy Lewis appeared on stage with Randall's Peachtree Pickers for the first time in the 1980s in Cedartown, Ga. Franks began making guest appearances with the Lewis Family around 1990 and continued throughout the 1990s at concerts and festivals. Franks made his final appearance with the group performing throughout their show at the Conasauga Bluegrass Festival in Dalton, Ga. in 2008. He also helped promote their farewell concert in 2009 in Lincolnton, Ga. Travis Lewis and Lewis Phillips from the group appeared on Franks's "Handshakes and Smiles" and "Sacred Sounds of Appalachia" releases. Southern Gospel Music Hall of Fame Roy “Pop” Lewis, Sr. appeared in his “Handshakes and Smiles” video. The family also appeared with him on the "In the Heat of the Night" "Christmas Time’s A Comin’" CD.

Chubby Wise

Franks appeared regularly with his fiddle hero Chubby Wise, International Bluegrass Music Hall of Fame member, at bluegrass festivals from 1989-1996 in Georgia, Florida and South Carolina playing twin fiddles with him. Wise appeared with Franks on the "In the Heat of the Night" Christmas Time's A Comin' CD and also appears with him performing "Golden Slippers" on his CD "30 Years on Radio and TV Volume II" 

"Doc" Tommy Scott and the Last Real Old Time Medicine Show

Franks began working with Country and Western Pioneer Ramblin’ "Doc" Tommy Scott and his Last Real Old Time Medicine Show initially behind the scenes as a songwriter, publishing administrator and film catalog manager in 1995. From Studio City, Calif. he booked the show at the 1996 Olympics. Scott and Franks co-wrote several songs including the Lewis Family hit “You Can’t Stop Time.” They recorded the 1999 “Comedy Down Home” album, and Scott’s “Say A Little Prayer” for the 2000 “God’s Children” CD. Franks produced and hosted the 2001 PBS documentary “Still Ramblin’” plus “Trail of the Hawk,” the story of Ramblin’ Tommy Scott. He appeared live and on television with the Medicine Show including on HGTV’s “Extreme Homes.”  
To raise funds for the Share America Foundation, Inc. in April 2009, Franks and Ramblin' Tommy Scott partnered on stage to present the play An Appalachian Gathering featuring a cast of 20 performers creating a slice of Southern life in the 1940s and present day highlighting the effects of the Medicine Show on small towns through Scott's eyes. Franks played Scott in the 1940s. Scott also appeared on the 2012 "Concert of Celebration" DVD.
Scott died on September 30, 2013, and Franks joined by the Watkins Family performed Scott's "Say A Little Prayer" at his private memorial service.

The Watkins Family

Randall Franks returned to performing on tour in 2007 after a several-year hiatus to care for his late mother. Franks asked the Watkins Family to join him as his band at those first performances both on stage and television.
Franks also agreed to assist the Watkins Family adding to their concerts as a special guest including appearances at the National Quartet Convention and on INSP. The acts have continued appearing in package shows and supporting each other's stage shows including the Watkins appearing on Franks's Hollywood Hillbilly Jamboree. The Watkins Family appeared with Franks on his CD "30 Years on Radio and TV Volume I" performing "Must Be a Reason" and "God's Children" with him.

Alan Autry

Randall Franks and Alan Autry through Autry-Franks Productions and Crimson Records released "Alan Autry and Randall Franks Mississippi Moon: Country Traditions" in 2013, an Americana CD featuring both actors vocally on various classic and original songs. The project which incorporates country, bluegrass and Southern gospel includes special appearances by Bluegrass Hall of Fame members Jim and Jesse McReynolds and three-time Dove Award nominee Mark Wheeler. The duo also produced and appeared on the "In the Heat of the Night Christmas Time's A Comin'" CD. Franks and Autry made an appearance on the Grand Ole Opry and two TNN appearances in 1991 joined by fellow actor David Hart. 

Elaine and Shorty - The GrassKats

Franks fiddled through his college years with the Georgia-based bluegrass band Elaine and Shorty - The GrassKats. The group during his tenure were Shorty (banjo) and Elaine Eager (guitar), and Mike Newberry (bass) and later Bruce Sims. Shorty Eager formerly performed with Jimmy Martin and his Sunny Mountain Boys. The group regularly appeared at festivals, concerts, clubs and on TV. Elaine and Shorty were honored by induction in the Atlanta Country Music Hall of Honor in 2007.

Discography"Ivory Halls" - The Peachtree PickersAttieram Records - AP I 1618  "Peach Picked Fiddle Favorites" - Randall Franks and the Peachtree PickersInitially released as a Perfection Sound cassette in 1985, Attieram cassette in 1987, then in 2008 as Crimson Records CD 1646. "Bluegrass Banjo" - The Peachtree Pickers"Building on Sand" - The Peachtree PickersAttieram Records - AP I 1626 "Pick of the Peaches Fiddlin'" - Randall Franks and the Peachtree PickersInitially released as an Attieram Records cassette in 1986, then in 2008 as Crimson Records CD 1656. "Golden River Fiddlin'" Randall "Randy" Franks with the Golden River GrassCrimson Records released Franks “Golden River Fiddlin’” cassette (RG 2760) to the Folk and Bluegrass markets in 1989 with positive reviews. Bluegrass Unlimited said he was "hard driving…straightahead…solid…sure” like Tommy Jackson and Paul Warren while his "special touch on the fiddle" was recognized by SPBGMA, the Society for the Preservation of Bluegrass Music in America. The CD was released in 2008."Handshakes and Smiles" Randall "Randy" FranksFranks began the 1990s as he crossed over to the Southern Gospel market being the first bluegrass performer to take his solo music project Crimson Records 2679 cassette Handshakes and Smiles to the Top 20 Sales Charts. Singing News gave it Four Stars. Musicians: Acoustic Bass – Travis Lewis; Acoustic Guitar – Mark Wheeler; Banjo – Lewis Phillips; Bass Guitar – Darrin Chambers; Steve Easter* Dobro – Steve Easter; Fiddle, Handclaps – Randall "Randy" Franks; Handclaps – Carol Lee Cooper, Dennis McCall; Harmonica, Piano – Jeff Easter
Mandolin – Eugene Akers, Jesse McReynolds; Backing Vocals – Carol Lee Cooper, Darrin Chambers, Dennis McCall, Jeff & Sheri Easter, Mark Wheeler, Sheri Easter. It was released as a CD in 2000.
He directed a music video of "Handshakes and Smiles" for the project which was nominated for a Telly Award and ran on country and gospel cable channels as well as NBC and CBS stations. Alan Autry, David Hart, Pop Lewis, Jesse McReynolds, Travis Lewis, Mark Wheeler and Lewis Phillips were among those making a special appearance.
 He's Never Gonna Fool Me Again / Rock of Ages - Randall "Randy" Franks – Vinyl, 7", 45 RPM, Single, Stereo 	Crimson Records (8) – CR-2679-01 Musicians: Bass – Travis Lewis; Dobro – Steve Easter; Fiddle, Producer – Randall Franks; Guitar – Mark Wheeler; Harmonica – Jeff Easter; Pressed By – United Record Pressing – U-26693M	
 You Better Get Ready / Pass Me Not - Randall "Randy" Franks – Vinyl, 7", 45 RPM, Single, Stereo Crimson Records (8) – CR-2679-01C, Crimson Records (8) – CR-2679-01D Musicians: Bass – Travis Lewis; Fiddle – Randall "Randy" Franks; Guitar – Mark Wheeler; Mandolin – Jesse McReynolds; Piano – Jeff Easter; Pressed By – United Record Pressing – U-28747"Sacred Sounds of Appalachia" Randall FranksInitially released by Sonlite Records for Zion in 1992, then later as Crimson Records CRZ111 in 1998, Randall “Randy” Franks created a collection of hymns supported by The Peachtree Pickers: Mark Wheeler, Lewis Phillips, Steve “Rabbit” Easter, Travis Lewis, Bill Everett, Eugene Akers, Earle Wheeler. Songs include Uncloudy Day; Beautiful Star of Bethlehem; Leaning on the Everlasting Arms; Sweet Hour of Prayer; Will the Circle Be Unbroken; Old Time Religion; Amazing Grace; Kneel at the Cross; Just A Rose Will Do; and This World Is Not My Home Several Sonlite radio singles were sent: This World Is Not My Home, Beautiful Star of Bethlehem, Leaning on the Everlasting Arms, Sweet Hour of Prayer and Leaning on the Everlasting Arms.

 Sonlite Singles CD Vol. 8 1992 Sonlite/Charity Records Sent to Radio: "Leaning on the Everlasting Arms" Randall "Randy" Franks from Sacred Sounds of Appalachia 
 "Sweet Hour of Prayer" Randall "Randy" Franks from Sacred Sounds of Appalachia
 "This World Is Not My Home" Randall "Randy" Franks from Sacred Sounds of Appalachia
 Sonlite Singles CD Vol. 10 1992 Sonlite/Charity Records Sent to Radio: "Beautiful Star of Bethlehem" Randall "Randy" Franks from Sacred Sounds of Appalachia
 "Bring A Torch Jeanette Isabella" Carroll O'Connor with Randall Franks, Jesse McReynolds, Abe Manuel, Jr. and Buddy Spicher from Christmas Times' A Comin' In the Heat of the Night Cast and Friends
 "Christmas Time's A Comin'" In the Heat of the Night Cast with Doug Dillard, Josh Graves, Jim and Jesse McReynolds, The Lewis Family, Wayne Lewis, Jimmy Martin, Ralph Stanley, Buddy Spicher, Chubby Wise and Mac Wiseman from Christmas Times' A Comin' In the Heat of the Night Cast and Friends"Tunes and Tales from Tunnel Hill" Randall Franks and the Sand Mountain BoysRandall Franks features a popular bluegrass music and comedy collection recorded during his most productive period of his country music career with the Sand Mountain Boys including Gary Waldrep, Kenny Townsel, Wayne Crain and Jerry Crain. (Crimson Records cassette 1634 1995 and CD 2007) 

 '"Mississippi Moon" - Randall FranksCrimson Cassette EP including 4 songs released in 1996.

 Sonlite Singles CD Vol. 22 1996 Sonlite Records Sent to Radio: "Let's Live Every Day Like It Was Christmas" Randall "Randy" Franks and The Whites from Christmas Times' A Comin' In the Heat of the Night Cast and Friends
 "Comedy Down Home" - Randall Franks with “Doc” Tommy ScottCrimson Records 1997 Other performers: Gary Waldrep, Kenneth Townsel, and James Watson

 Galaxy Entertainment CD radio compilation Hometown Christmas Favorites 1997 “The Pilgrimage to Bethlehem” Randall Franks from Crimson cassette “Golden River Fiddlin’”
 Galaxy Entertainment CD radio compilation Hometown Gospel Favorites Vol. 1 1998 “Rock of Ages” Randall Franks from Crimson cassette “Golden River Fiddlin’”
 Galaxy Entertainment CD radio compilation Hometown Gospel Favorites Vol. 2 1999 “Precious Memories” Randall Franks from Crimson cassette “Golden River Fiddlin’”
 "God's Children" Randall Franks and David Davis LAMP Music Group CD 2001 Sent to Radio: “Children in Need” Randall Franks and David Davis with Sonny Shroyer performing the Franks and Ramblin’ “Doc” Tommy Scott recitation from God’s Children.
 "An Appalachian Musical Revival: Live at the Ringgold Depot” Randall Franks and ....Franks led a cast of Appalachian artists to create the Share America/Crimson CD "An Appalachian Musical Revival: Live at the Ringgold Depot” in 2008. The project raised funds for the Pearl and Floyd Franks Scholarship for the Share America Foundation, Inc. It featured Franks with Four Fold, Buddy Liles, the Marksmen Quartet, Barney Miller, the Smoky Mountain Boys, the Southern Sound Quartet, the Testimony Quartet, Voices Won, Walnut Grove Bluegrass Band, the Watkins Family, Garrett Arb, Brady Hughes, John Rice, Deborah Taylor, Calvary Strings, Mt. Peria Baptist Church Male Chorus and the Ringgold United Methodist Church Chancel Choir.

 "Early Gospel Favorites" - Randall Franks and the Peachtree Pickers 
Crimson Records CR 1527 2010 

 "Down at Raccoon Creek" - Randall Franks and the Peachtree Pickers 
Crimson Records CR 1926 2010 

 "Early Bluegrass Recordings" - Randall Franks and the Peachtree Pickers 
Crimson Records CR 2892 2012 

 "A Concert of Celebration: A Mountain Pearl" Randall Franks and ...Franks brought a A Concert of Celebration: A Mountain Pearl to DVD in 2012 sharing a musical tribute to the Appalachian stories of Pearl and Floyd Franks through artists who shared in their lives. Franks led a cast of mountain musical stars through new performances and vintage footage including Paul Brown, John and Debbie Farley, Ramblin' "Doc" Tommy Scott, Curly Seckler, Peanut Faircloth with the Trust Jesus Singers, Chubby Wise, David Davis, Johnny Counterfit, Gary Waldrep, Barney Miller, Jeff & Sheri Easter, Bill Monroe and the Blue Grass Boys, Butch Lanham, Doodle and the Golden River Grass, Dale Tilley, Jesse McReynolds, Johnnie Sue and Nelson Richardson.

 "Mississippi Moon" - Randall Franks and Alan AutryAlan Autry and Randall Franks, best known as “Bubba Skinner” and “Officer Randy Goode” from the Mississippi set NBC and CBS series “In the Heat of the Night” (1988-1994), join voices for the Crimson Records Americana CD “Mississippi Moon - Country Traditions” in 2013. Within the collection, each share songs vocally while Franks contributes musically and as producer throughout the project. Autry-Franks Productions created the project released by Crimson Records.

 "Mountain Opry Memories" Randall FranksShare America Foundation released a fundraising CD (SAF102) entitled Randall Franks "Mountain Opry Memories" in 2013 featuring 17 recordings taken from impromptu appearances on the stage of the Mountain Opry in Walden, Tenn. on Signal Mountain from 1999–2010. The project was produced by Franks, Tom Adkins and Tom Morgan. The recording includes special appearances by David Davis, the late country pioneer Charlie "Peanut" Faircloth, Mountain Cove Bluegrass Band, Valley Grass and others. The project raises funds for both Share America and the Mountain Opry.

 "Precious Memories" Randall Franks and ...Share America Foundation taped 18 songs for “Precious Memories” live at the Ringgold Depot in 2014 featuring Randall Franks, Calvary’s Blend, Cody Harvey, Butch Lanham, Tim Owens and Journey On, Ryan Stinson and Johnnie Sue. 

 “Country Kids” Randall Franks and the Peachtree Pickers 
Crimson Records released “Country Kids” (CR-2899) in 2014, a collection of previously unreleased recordings spanning from 1975-1983.

 "Keep 'Em Smilin'" Randall FranksCrimson Records released his Christian music and comedy CD "Keep 'Em Smilin'" in 2016 after Franks premiered it in an appearance with former U.S. President Jimmy Carter. The album includes some of his most frequently requested songs, accompanied by Southern gospel pianist Curtis Broadway.

 "Americana Youth of Southern Appalachia" Randall Franks with ...Share America Foundation released a fundraising CD entitled Randall Franks "Americana Youth of Southern Appalachia" in 2019 featuring 18 recordings highlighting over 30 youth, ages 11–27 to radio. The project was released to radio in a partnership with AirPlay Direct achieving the #1 spot on the June 2019 Top 50 APD Americana Global Charts. The project features Emerald Butler; Warren Carnes; Phillip Cross; Landon Fitzpatrick; Nicholas Hickman; Trevor Holder; Kings Springs Road of Johnson City, Tenn. including Tyler Griffith, Owen Schinkel, Kylie Anderson, Josh Meade, and Max Silverstein; Isaac Moore; Mountain Cove Bluegrass Band of Chattanooga, Tenn. including Eli Beard, Cody Harvey, Colin Mabry, Wil Markham, Tyler Martelli, and Chris Brown; Matthew Nave; Wally O'Donald; Drew Sherrill; SingAkadamie including Jacob Trotter, Grant Lewellen, Nicholas Hickman, Lilly Anne York, Haleigh Grey, Kayla Starks, Chelsea Brewster, Logan Lynne and Kiersten Suttles; Landon Wall; and Tyler West. The other musicians contributing their talents to the effort on various recordings are special guests Gospel Music Hall of Fame member Jeff Hullender, SingAkadamie director Sheri Thrower, Tim Witt, John Roberts; Bary Wilde; Chris Gordon; Tim Neal; and Mitch Snow. The project was created over 18 months allowing the first opportunity for many of the performers to write a song, record or play with other musicians. The effort was supported by a grant from the North Georgia Electric Membership Corporation Foundation, Kiwanis Club of Ringgold, and the Wes and Shirley Smith Charitable Endowment. The 18 recordings include: Original Songs - It's A Hard Road to Make Love Easy; How Could I Go?; What About All These American Flags?; Wash Day; Time for the Blues; Midnight Train; Filling the River with Tears; Someone Greater Than I; I Believe He Spoke to Me; five standards - The Star Spangled Banner; When We All Get to Heaven & Blessed Assurance; Farther Along; and I Want to Be Ready; and five covers - Chet Atkin's “Baby’s Coming Home;” Billy Joel's “Piano Man;” Dwight Yoakam's “Traveler’s Lantern;” Ramblin’ Tommy Scott's “Been Gone A Long Time;” and Billy Hill's “Old Spinning Wheel.” The project raises funds for both Share America.

 “Faith Will See Us Through” Randall FranksHis 2020 collection of Hope released exclusively for radio by Crimson Records and the Share America Foundation features a mix of solo gospel songs from Randall Franks TV and television and DVD performances with the Watkins Family, his Peachtree Pickers and members of his Hollywood Hillbilly Jamboree. It includes the Feb. 2023 #1 Bluegrass Gospel song “God’s Children” with the Watkins Family which Franks co-wrote with Cotton Carrier. (Cashbox Magazine) 

Chart Songs
 #1  “God’s Children” with the Watkins Family Feb. 1, 2023 Cashbox Magazine Bluegrass Gospel Charts  
 #1  "He's Never Gonna Fool Me Again" Dec.  19, 2013    IBA Bluegrass/Americana Charts
 #1  "Old Joe Clark"                  Sept. 16, 2013    IBM BSM Global Chart
 #13 "Bonaparte's Retreat"            March 28, 2014    CMG/BSM Americana/Bluegrass (Top 20)
 #25 "Filling the River with Tears"   June 2019         APD Top 50 Americana Global Singles
 #28 "Bonaparte's Retreat"            March 28, 2014    CMG Radio Country Music Chart (Top 100)
 #29 "What About All These American Flags" June 2019    APD Top 50 Americana Global Singles
 #42 "The Kind of Love I Can't Forget" with Peanut Faircloth June 2019 APD Top 50 Country/Alt. Global Singles

From Randall's Americana Youth of Southern Appalachia

 Top 50 APD Americana / Grassicana Global Singles - June 2019  
 #11 Farther Along - Isaac Moore
 #16 When We All Get to Heaven & Blessed Assurance - Colton Brown
 #18 The Star-Spangled Banner - SingAkadamie (Sheri Thrower)
 #19 I Want to Be Ready - Mountain Cove Bluegrass Band 
 #24 It's A Hard Road to Make Love Easy - Ryan Stinson 
 #25 Filling the River with Tears - Randall Franks with Mountain Cove Bluegrass Band 
 #27 Piano Man - Colton Brown
 #28 I Believe He Spoke to Me - Nicholas Hickman with SingAkadamie 
 #29 What About All These American Flags? - Randall Franks
 #33 Been Gone A Long Time - Wally O'Donald and SingAkadamie 
 #34 Someone Greater Than I - Ryan Stinson with Jeff Hullender (The Hullender Family)
 #36 Old Spinning Wheel - Landon Fitzpatrick
 #39 Midnight Train - Phillip Cross
 #40 Baby's Coming Home - Caleb Lewis
 #49 How Could I Go? - Emerald Butler

Chart Albums

 #1 Randall Franks Americana Youth of Southern Appalachia June 2019 Top 50 APD Americana/Grassicana Global Albums
 #1 Randall Franks Americana Youth of Southern Appalachia Feb. 13, 2021 Top 50 APD Global Albums 
 #1 In the Heat of the Night Cast and Friends Christmas Time's A Comin' Oct. 2019 Top 50 APD Christmas Global Albums
 #2 In the Heat of the Night Cast and Friends Christmas Time's A Comin' Dec. 2019 Top 50 APD Global Albums
 #4 In the Heat of the Night Cast and Friends Christmas Time's A Comin' Oct. 17, 2021 Top 50 APD Global Albums
 #8, #16 & #19 Randall Franks Americana Youth of Southern Appalachia  May 2020 Top 50 APD Global Albums
 #9 Randall Franks Americana Youth of Southern Appalachia June 2019 Top 50 Global Albums All Genres 
 #10 Randall Franks Americana Youth of Southern Appalachia Feb. 2020 Top 50 APD Americana/Grassicana Global Albums
 #10 Randall Franks - Faith Will See Us Through April 26, 2021 Top 50 APD Global Albums
 #16 Randall Franks - God's Children          July 2019      Top 50 APD Bluegrass/Folk Global Albums
 #12 Randall Franks - APD Music Page          June 2019      Top 50 APD Christian/Gospel Global Albums
 #18 Randall Franks - "Keep 'Em Smilin'"      June 2019      Top 50 APD Christian/Gospel Global Albums
 #18 Randall Franks - Handshakes and Smiles   June 1990 Top 20 Christian Sales Charts The Music City News
 #20 Randall Franks - Mountain Opry Memories'''  June 2019      Top 50 APD Bluegrass/Folk Global Albums
 #20 & #45 Randall Franks - Faith Will See Us Through June 2020    Top 50 APD Global Albums
 #25 Randall Franks - APD Music Page                Jan. 25, 2022  Top 50 APD Global Albums 
 #36 In the Heat of the Night Cast and Friends Christmas Time's A Comin' Top 50 ALLTIME APD Holiday/Christmas Albums 

Recording Executive & Producer

Franks served as director for A & R for MBM Records and its family of labels including Encore and ASL and coordinated its publishing company.

Bluegrass label Atteiram Records also called upon Franks as a graphic artist and liner note writer using him to design album covers or cassette inserts for many of its artists. Some among those were The Crain Brothers, Appalachian Express, James Monroe, Jim Southern and Southern Sounds, Joe Stuart and Carl Sauceman, Brother Birch Monroe, Frank Buchanan, Carl Story and the Rambling Mountaineers, Vic Jordan, The Ridgerunners, The Boyd Brothers, Hubert Cox and the Southern Grass, The Blue Ridge Gentlemen, The Pinnacle Boys, and Southwind.

Franks used his television popularity to widen the retail distribution of artists in bluegrass and Southern gospel into the mainstream record and radio markets.

 In the Heat of the Night Christmas 

Franks and his In the Heat of the Night co-star Alan Autry joined forces under the banner of Autry-Franks Productions to produce the charity In the Heat of the Night CD Christmas Time's A Comin  featuring the them and the other cast members of the show Carroll O'Connor , Howard Rollins, Anne-Marie Johnson, David Hart (actor), Geoffrey Thorne, Crystal Fox, Wilbur Fitzgerald, Sharon Pratt and others. The project raised funds for drug abuse prevention charities.

With Franks producing, Autry performed his rendition of "Rudolph the Red-Nosed Reindeer" in homage to Gene Autry. Franks performed an original song with Grand Ole Opry stars The Whites entitled "Let's Live Everyday Like It was Christmas". The duo both performed on "Jingle Bells" and "Christmas Time's A Comin ". Franks and Autry were able to include many music legends, some among them, Country Music Hall of Famers Kitty Wells, Jimmy Dickens, and Pee Wee King as well as many top legends from the Bluegrass genre, from Jim and Jesse to the Lewis Family. The Christmas Time's A Comin '' CD released on Sonlite and MGM/UA was popular in 1991 and 1992.

Autry and Franks marked the 20th Anniversary in 2012 with a charity re-release available from the Share America Foundation, Inc. The duo released it to worldwide radio in a partnership with AirPlay Direct in 2019 seeing the project climb to #1 on the AirPlay Direct Global Christmas Radio Charts. In 2022, the album hit #36 on the AirPlay Direct Top 50 Global Holiday/Christmas Albums

Music publishing

Franks opened Peach Picked Publishing associated with Broadcast Music Inc. in the early 1980s focusing initially on the music created by him and his bandmates. While he has written songs for large publishing companies including Lowery Music Group, Chris White Music, and Chestnut Mound Publishing, he continues writing for Peach Picked including his hit bluegrass recording "Filling the River with Tears", popularized by David Davis and the Warrior River Boys. Eventually, Peach Picked expanded to include work from bluegrass hall of fame members including Chubby Wise and Curly Seckler, Georgia Music Hall of Fame member Cotton Carrier, and recordings by acts including Marty Stuart, Ralph Stanley, The Grateful Dead, and David Davis and the Warrior River Boys. Franks also formed Randall Franks Music to manage the publishing and music catalogs of other artists. In this effort, he has assisted artists in negotiating monies from film, television, and sources around the world, including artists Ramblin' "Doc" Tommy Scott, Bill Monroe, Jim and Jesse, Flatt & Scruggs and the Foggy Mountain Boys, and Curly Seckler.

Awards
Franks was inducted into the Atlanta Country Music Hall of Fame in 2004  and the North Georgia Musicians Wall of Fame in 2009. The Carolinas Country, Bluegrass and Gospel Hall of Fame presented him it’s Legend Award and designated him as the “Appalachian Ambassador of the Fiddle” in 2010. He was inducted into the Independent Country Music Hall of Fame in 2013, America's Old Time Country Music Hall of Fame in 2019, Catoosa County Chamber Business Person Hall of Fame  and Catoosa County Patriotic Citizen of the Year in 2020 and the Tri-State Gospel Music Hall of Fame in 2022.

As an actor, Randall shares in several awards, primarily, two NAACP Awards for Outstanding Drama Series in 1992 and 1993 during his time on "In the Heat of the Night", two Golden Globe nominations for Best Television Drama in 1990 and 1991, and several Film Festival Awards including Best Feature Film and Best Ensemble Cast for the film "The Cricket's Dance."

Franks has been honored with many awards including the Fiddlin' John Carson Award, A.S.E. Male Vocalist of the Year, The Cotton Carrier Award, Little Jimmy Dempsey Musician Award, and a Sons of the American Revolution Citizenship Award. The Governor of Kentucky honored him for his contributions to the music of Bill Monroe. Catoosa County designated him "Appalachian Ambassador of the Fiddle" in 2004. Franks received the Songwriter of the Year Award from the Atlanta Society of Entertainers in 2009 for his song "The Old Black Fiddle" and also received Bluegrass Band of the Year with the Georgia Bluegrass Mafia Band. The International Bluegrass Music Museum in Owensboro, Kentucky honored Franks as a Bluegrass Legend at its 2010 and 2011 Pioneers of Bluegrass Gatherings alongside fellow Blue Grass Boys and other pioneers.

Randall Franks and the Georgia Mafia Bluegrass Band received the 2010, 2011, 2012, 2013, 2015, 2016 and 2018 Atlanta Society of Entertainers Bluegrass Band of the Year Award. The Appalachian Ambassador of the Fiddle was honored as a feature performer alongside the Watkins Family by the Appalachian Regional Commission at its annual conference in 2010.

Randall Franks was a 2010 Diamond Award nominee for Top Bluegrass Artist included among Bound & Determined, Dailey & Vincent, Doyle Lawson & Quicksilver, Isaacs, Jeff & Sheri Easter, Joe Cook Family, Primitive Quartet, Sandi Kay & New Hickory and the Watkins Family. 

Franks said he was honored when the Georgia Music Hall of Fame and Museum in Macon featured an exhibit on his career in the Skillet Licker Café beside other Georgia notables Alan Jackson, Travis Tritt, and Trisha Yearwood, which was highlighted from 1996–2007.

Franks was honored in 2013 by Georgia Gov. Nathan Deal with a special commendation for his community service and philanthropy benefiting the people of Georgia. This was presented in conjunction with the Kiwanis International Distinguished Service Award.

Charitable Efforts

He is president of the Share America Foundation Randall Franks | Share America Foundation that provides encouragement through the Pearl and Floyd Franks Scholarship to youth who are continuing the musical arts of Appalachia.

Franks serves as the Chairman for the Catoosa Citizens for Literacy in 2022-2023 and formally in 2002-04 and he took that position again in 2007-09 after serving as co-chair for two years. The organization operates the Catoosa County Learning Center helping residents reach their goals by learning to read, getting a GED or acquiring basic computer skills.

He serves as treasurer of the Catoosa County Local Emergency Planning Committee. The organization brings together all of the agencies the community relies upon each day when a need arises.

He is former Vice President and secretary and serves on the legislative committee for the Georgia Production Partnership, a Georgia Film Industry organization which works to improve industry growth and opportunities.

He is a member of the Boynton Lions Club, Catoosa Family Collaborative, Nathan Anderson Cemetery Committee, Catoosa Fuller Center for Housing, Catoosa County Chamber of Commerce and the Catoosa County Historical Society. He is a past president of the Kiwanis Club of Ringgold.

Franks is a founder of the SouthEastern Bluegrass Music Association (SEBA https://www.sebabluegrass.org/) and was honored by the organization in 2011 for his 1984 efforts.

He is a Southern Gospel Music Hall of Fame board advisor. Franks serves as a field researcher for several museums throughout the South.

Public Service

Franks served on the city council as Vice Mayor, Council Chairman and Councilmember in Ringgold, Georgia during four terms from  June 2009 - Dec. 31, 2021. He formally volunteered as the Ringgold Downtown Development Authority Chairman and Ringgold Convention and Visitor's Bureau vice chairman serving just over a decade between the two offices.

References

External links

 at AirPlayDirect.com

Living people
American fiddlers
Year of birth missing (living people)
American male actors
American male writers
Southern gospel performers
21st-century violinists